Senator Hess may refer to:

Henry L. Hess (1890–1974), Oregon State Senate
Ralph Hess (born 1939), Pennsylvania State Senate